The next election to the Landtag of Saxony is scheduled for autumn 2024.

Background 
The 2019 election was marked by high gains for the AfD, which gained almost 18 percent of the vote and became the second strongest force. After losses, the CDU ended up with almost 32 percent as the strongest party ahead of the AfD. The Left and the SPD received 10.4 and 7.7 percent of the vote, respectively. The Greens increased and achieved their best result in a state election in Saxony with 8.6 percent, the FDP again missed entering parliament with 4.5 percent.

Opinion polls

Graphical summary

Party polling

References

See also 

2024 elections in Germany
Elections in Saxony